Fahrul Razi Bin Kamaruddin (born 12 April 1986) is a Malaysian footballer who plays for DDM FC in the Malaysia M3 League.

Club career
He formerly played for Kuala Lumpur FA. He also played for UiTM FC, where he helps them to win various varsity championships, among them Liga IPT 2010.

He agreed to join Perak FA for the 2012 Malaysia Super League. He played for them for only that season, before being released at the end of the season.

Fahrul joined Sime Darby F.C. for the 2013 Malaysia Premier League along with four ex-Perak players.

International career
He was selected to represent Malaysia varsity national football team in various international varsity championships like FISU World Cup and Universiade.

References

External links
 

1986 births
Living people
Malaysian footballers
Sportspeople from Kuala Lumpur
Kuala Lumpur City F.C. players
UiTM FC players
Perak F.C. players
Sime Darby F.C. players
Malaysia Super League players
Association football wingers
Malaysian people of Malay descent